Andrei Igorevich Kireyev (born 6 July 1985) is a Russian former professional footballer.

Club career
He made his debut in the Russian Premier League on 25 July 2007 for FC Rubin Kazan in a game against FC Lokomotiv Moscow. He played 2 games in the UEFA Intertoto Cup 2007 for Rubin.

References

1985 births
Sportspeople from Ryazan
Living people
Russian footballers
Association football midfielders
Russian Premier League players
FC Rubin Kazan players
FC Rostov players
FC Ufa players
FC Vityaz Podolsk players
FC Fakel Voronezh players
FC SKA-Khabarovsk players
PFC CSKA Moscow players
FC Rotor Volgograd players
FC Avangard Kursk players
FC Neftekhimik Nizhnekamsk players
FC Akron Tolyatti players
FC Nosta Novotroitsk players